Konstantin Samofalov is a politician in Serbia. He was a Democratic Party (Demokratska stranka, DS) member of the National Assembly of Serbia from 2007 to 2014 and also served in the Assembly of the City of Belgrade from 2004 to 2008. He is now a member of the breakaway Social Democratic Party (Socijaldemokratska stranka, SDS).

Early life and private career
Samofalov was born in Belgrade, in what was then the Socialist Republic of Serbia in the Socialist Federal Republic of Yugoslavia. His great-grandfather was a Russian military officer who immigrated to Belgrade in 1923. He participated in protests against Slobodan Milošević's government in 1999; in a 2017 article for Danas, he recounted how he had been physically attacked by regime supporters at some events. He graduated from the University of Belgrade Faculty of Law in 2007 and in advanced defence and security studies from the Military Academy of Serbia's University of Defence in 2012. He was written about his own and his family's experience in the Serbian Armed Forces.

He is a Senior Network Member at the European Leadership Network (ELN).

Political career

Democratic Party
Samofalov joined the DS in 2000 and served as president of its youth branch. In the 2004 Serbian local elections, he appeared on the party's electoral lists for both the Assembly of the City of Belgrade and the Vračar municipal assembly. The DS won both the city and the municipality elections; Samofalov was selected for the party's city assembly delegation and served for the next four years.

In January 2005, Samofalov took part in a media prank with other members of the DS's youth wing, in which the party activists left alarm clocks, car radios, and cellphones on the doorstep of Serbian prime minister Vojislav Koštunica to allow him to "wake up, hear the news, and communicate with the nation." (This was in reference to the prime minister's perceived aloofness.) They also attempted to award Koštunica with a diploma for "extraordinary efforts to lead Serbia back into the darkness" for his refusal to extradite war crimes suspects to the International Criminal Tribunal for the Former Yugoslavia (ICTY).

Samofalov received the 204th position out of 250 on the DS's electoral list in the 2007 Serbian parliamentary election. The list won sixty-four mandates and subsequently formed an unstable coalition government with Koštunica's rival Democratic Party of Serbia (Demokratska stranka Srbija, DSS). Samofalov was included in his party's assembly delegation and served as a supporter of the administration. (From 2000 to 2011, parliamentary mandates were awarded to sponsoring parties or coalitions rather than to individual candidates, and it was common practice for the parties to distribute their mandates out of numerical order. Samofalov's low position on the list – which was in any event mostly alphabetical – had no bearing on whether he received a mandate.)

He was included on the DS's For a European Serbia coalition list in the 2008 parliamentary election and was again awarded a mandate after the list won 102 seats. After protracted negotiations, the DS formed a new coalition government with the Socialist Party of Serbia and other parties, and Samofalov continued to serve with the government's parliamentary majority. He did not seek re-election to the Belgrade assembly in the concurrent 2008 local elections but was again included on the DS list for the Vračar municipal assembly and, on this occasion, was granted a mandate to serve in that body.

Samofalov served on the National Assembly's security committee in the 2008–12 parliament and was a member of Serbia's delegation to the North Atlantic Treaty Organization (NATO) Parliamentary Assembly, where Serbia has observer status. He led Serbia's delegation to the NATO assembly for a 2010 meeting in Riga and a 2012 meeting in Tallinn. In June 2010, he defended Serbia's policy of military neutrality and said that the DS-led administration would not actually seek to join NATO. In the same year, he responded to an announcement that NATO would reduce its deployment in Kosovo and Metohija by saying that "negotiations with Albanians should start as soon as possible so that the historical conflict between Serbs and Albanians comes to an end."

Serbia's electoral system was reformed in 2011, such that parliamentary mandates were awarded in numerical order to candidates on successful lists. Samofalov received the sixty-first position on the DS's Choice for a Better Life list and was re-elected when the list won sixty-seven mandates. The Serbian Progressive Party formed a new government with the Socialists after the election, and the DS moved to the opposition. Samofalov was a deputy member of Serbia's delegation to the NATO Parliamentary Assembly in the parliament that followed. He was also re-elected to a second term in the Vračar municipal assembly in the concurrent 2012 local elections.

Social Democratic Party
The DS experienced a serious split in early 2014, with former leader Boris Tadić setting up a new breakaway group that was originally called the New Democratic Party. This party contested the 2014 Serbian parliamentary election in a fusion with the Greens of Serbia and in alliance with other parties. Samofalov sided with Tadić in the split and received the twenty-third position on the new coalition list; he narrowly missed re-election when the list won eighteen seats. The New Democratic Party re-constituted itself as the Social Democratic Party later in the year, and Samofalov was one of its founding members.

In the 2016 Serbian parliamentary election, the SDS ran on a coalition list with the Liberal Democratic Party and the League of Social Democrats of Vojvodina. Samofalov was a spokesperson for the SDS during the campaign, in which context he accused Aleksandar Vučić's Progressive-led government of “erosion of media freedom, destruction of democratic institutions, and devastation of the Serbian economy.” He received the thirty-fourth position on the coalition list and was not returned when the list won only thirteen mandates.

He stood down from the Vračar municipal assembly in 2016. In the 2018 Belgrade city election, the SDS participated in a coalition list included the DS and other parties. Samofalov received the eleventh position on the list, which failed to cross the electoral threshold to win representation in the assembly.

References

1982 births
Living people
Members of the National Assembly (Serbia)
Members of the City Assembly of Belgrade
Members of the NATO Parliamentary Assembly
Democratic Party (Serbia) politicians
Social Democratic Party (Serbia) politicians
Serbian people of Russian descent